Jean-Pierre Baert (born 29 November 1951) is a Belgian former professional racing cyclist. He rode in the 1976 Tour de France.

References

External links
 

1951 births
Living people
Belgian male cyclists
People from Wetteren
Cyclists from East Flanders